Scabrotrophon manai is a species of sea snail, a marine gastropod mollusk, in the family Muricidae, the murex snails or rock snails.

Description
The length of the shell attains 31.4 mm.

Distribution
This snail lives in water off Papua New Guinea.

References

manai
Gastropods described in 2016